Michael Cochrane (born September 4, 1948 in Peekskill, New York) is an American jazz pianist who has recorded extensively for SteepleChase Records, as well as Soul Note and Landmark Records.

As a sideman, he has recorded with Marvin Peterson, Oliver Lake, Sonny Fortune  and Jack Walrath.

Discography
As a Leader
 Elements (Soul Note, 1985) with Tom Harrell, Trumpet; Bob Malach, Tenor Saxophone, Flute; Dennis Irwin, Bass; James Madison, Drums
 Song of Change (Soul Note, 1992)
 Impressions (Landmark, 1995)
 Cutting Edge (Steeplechase, 1997)
 Footprints (Steeplechase, 1998)
 Gesture of Faith (Steeplechase, 2000)
 Minor Matrix (Steeplechase, 2000)
 Quartet Music (Steeplechase, 2001)
 Pathways (Steeplechase, 2000)
 Right Now (Steeplechase, 2007)

With Sonny Fortune
Waves of Dreams (Horizon, 1976)
With Jack Walrath
Revenge of the Fat People (Stash, 1981)
In Europe (SteepleChase, 1982)
A Plea for Sanity (Stash, 1982)
Jack Walrath Quintet at Umbria Jazz Festival, Vol. 1 (Red, 1983 [1985])
Jack Walrath Quintet at Umbria Jazz Festival, Vol. 2 (Red, 1983 [1985])
Gut Feelings (Muse, 1990 [1992])
With Nancy Monroe
Dance My Heart (mja Records, 1994) 
The Love Within (mja Records, 2001) 
With David Alan Gross
The Final Answer To Everything (mja records, 1997)

References

1948 births
Living people
American jazz pianists
American male pianists
SteepleChase Records artists
Landmark Records artists
Black Saint/Soul Note artists
People from Peekskill, New York
Musicians from New York (state)
20th-century American pianists
Jazz musicians from New York (state)
21st-century American pianists
20th-century American male musicians
21st-century American male musicians
American male jazz musicians